Nidogen-1 (NID-1), formerly known as entactin, is a protein that in humans is encoded by the NID1 gene. Both nidogen-1 and nidogen-2 are essential components of the basement membrane alongside other components such as type IV collagen, proteoglycans (heparan sulfate and glycosaminoglycans), laminin and fibronectin.

Function 

Nidogen-1 is a member of the nidogen family of basement membrane glycoproteins. The protein interacts with several other components of basement membranes. Structurally it (along with perlecan) connects the networks formed by collagens and laminins to each other. It may also play a role in cell interactions with the extracellular matrix.

Clinical significance 
Mutations in NID1 cause autosomal dominant Dandy–Walker malformation with occipital encephalocele (ADDWOC).

Interactions 

Nidogen-1 has been shown to interact with FBLN1.

References

Further reading

External links
 
 

Human proteins
Glycoproteins
Extracellular matrix proteins
Genes on human chromosome 1